Czeluścin  is a village in the administrative district of Gmina Czerniejewo, within Gniezno County, Greater Poland Voivodeship, in west-central Poland.

The village has a population of 135.

In the village there once was a family with the surname, Czeluściński.

References

Villages in Gniezno County